Lucas N'Guessan (born 6 November 1997) is a Dutch basketball player who plays for Navarra of the LEB Oro.

Early life
Born in De Lier to an Ivorian father and Dutch mother, N'Guessan moved to Spain at age 16 to play for the Canarias Basketball Academy (CBA).

College career
N'Guessan started his college career with Oklahoma State, where he played two seasons. He then transferred to East Tennessee State. In his senior year, he averaged 9 points and 6 rebounds in 21 minutes.

Professional career
In August 2020, N'Guessan signed his first professional contract with Força Lleida. He averaged 4.2 points and 3.4 rebounds over 17 games.

On 7 July 2021, N'Guessan signed with Yoast United in the Netherlands. On 8 February 2022, N'Guessan left United when he returned to Spain to play with Navarra of the LEB Oro.

National team career
In the summer of 2021, N'Guessan was selected for the preliminary team of the Netherlands national basketball team.

References

1997 births
Living people
Centers (basketball)
Basket Navarra Club players
Dutch men's basketball players
Dutch expatriate basketball people in the United States
East Tennessee State Buccaneers men's basketball players
Força Lleida CE players
Oklahoma State Cowboys basketball players
People from De Lier
Yoast United players
Sportspeople from South Holland